Goran Petković (Serbian Cyrillic: Горан Петковић; born 5 March 1975) is a retired Serbian professional football midfielder.

His previous clubs include FK Zemun, Greeks Kallithea F.C. and Agios Dimitrios F.C., and FK BASK

Petković, with Kallithea F.C. played in the Greek Super League.

Goran Petković Kallithea Video

References

External links
 Profile at Srbijafudbal

1975 births
Living people
Footballers from Belgrade
Serbian footballers
Association football midfielders
FK Zemun players
Kallithea F.C. players
Super League Greece players
Expatriate footballers in Greece
FK BASK players